Michael Broggie (born June 19, 1942) is an historian and author who has researched the life and legacy of Walt Disney. As a public speaker, he toured the country lecturing on his first-person experiences with Walt Disney and many of the Disney Legends, including his father, Roger E. Broggie, who was selected by Walt Disney to be his first Imagineer.

Early life
Born in Los Angeles, California, Broggie grew up between Lake Arrowhead and the San Fernando Valley.  His father, Roger E. Broggie, was the head of Walt Disney Studio's machine shop.  As a small child, Michael Broggie got to ride on Walt Disney's backyard 1/8-scale model Carolwood Pacific Railroad, which his father helped to build.

Broggie earned an MBA and a doctorate in Marketing - summa cum laude - at Pacific University, San Diego; a BA in Communications from California State University, Northridge; and an AA in Journalism - with honors - from Los Angeles Valley College.  He is a veteran of the United States Air Force, where he served in the Aerospace Medical Command as a pharmacy specialist.  He attended Lincoln University School of Law, San Francisco but did not graduate. He attended Rim of the World High School at Lake Arrowhead and graduated from North Hollywood High School. In 2010, he was awarded an Honorary Diploma by Rim of the World High School, where his family annually sponsors music scholarship awards to a graduating boy and girl in memory of his mother, Thelma C. Broggie, who was a concert violinist. He has two children, Michael Jr. and Stephen and one stepson, Timothy.

Professional career 

Broggie's first job with Disney was in 1960, as an attractions Cast Member (ride operator) at Disneyland on the Autopia and Mine Train during summer seasons while attending college.  After completing his undergraduate education, he joined the Walt Disney Studios in Burbank, California, as a publicity writer in the motion picture marketing department.

For three years in the early 1970s, he returned to his hometown of Lake Arrowhead and served as the executive vice president and general manager of Lake Arrowhead Development Company, owners and developers of the resort. Under his administration, the lake was transferred to a community corporation owned in common by area property owners.

On behalf of the model railroad industry, Broggie appeared in 30 cities as the featured presenter of “Walt Disney's Railroad Story” on a national tour titled “World's Greatest Hobby.”

With his wife, Sharon, he is co-founder and Chairman of The Carolwood Society and the Carolwood Foundation. The foundation operates Walt Disney's Carolwood Barn and other Disney-related exhibits within the Los Angeles Live Steamers Railroad Museum in Griffith Park, Los Angeles, on behalf of Walt Disney's family.

A member of the Westlake Yacht Club, he was founder and served as the initial CEO of The Nautical Foundation, a non-profit corporation that raises funds to promote the values and opportunities of youth and competitive sailing.

He is co-founder and president of the Prescott Police Foundation. He and Sharon served eight years as volunteers in the Prescott Police Department's unit of Citizens on Patrol (COP). He was appointed to three terms on the Appeals Board of the Prescott Fire Department, the last term as chairman ended in 2020.

He is advocating for the State of Arizona to again compete for motion picture and television productions, which was a successful industry for many decades until the state eliminated certain tax incentives and other financial benefits. He estimates that Arizona has lost over a billion dollars and employment opportunities to other states that aggressively pursue the film industry. Dating back to the silent era, over 130 motion pictures and countless television productions and commercials have been made in Arizona due to its climate and variety of scenic locales.

Michael and Sharon reside at Prescott Lakes, Arizona.

Author 
Broggie is the author or co-author of eight books.  His book released in June 2006 Air Force One: The Final Mission, describing the history of the Presidential Boeing 707 installed at the Ronald Reagan Presidential Library in Simi Valley, California.  His 430-page book, Walt Disney’s Railroad Story, was awarded in 1998 with the Benjamin Franklin Gold Medal for Best Biography from the Publishers Marketing Association (PMA). Broggie's biographical profile of Warren Buffett’s longtime partner, Charlie Munger, is contained in a 470-page book edited by Peter Kaufman, Poor Charlie’s Almanack, released in 2005. His inspirational book of photographs and motivational words beginning with the letter C titled "Walt Disney's Words of Wisdom" was released in 2010. "The History of Disney Merchandise" was written for The Walt Disney Company in 2001. "Walt Disney's Happy Place," is an illustrated biography of Walt Disney designed for shared reading by children and adults.  He is the author of the official souvenir guide to the Ronald Reagan Presidential Library and Museum. As a commission by the City of Irwindale, California, he researched and wrote "The History of Irwindale: Garden of Rocks." He has authored and edited numerous articles for regional and national publications.

See also

Rail transport in Walt Disney Parks and Resorts

References

Sources 
 Broggie, Michael (2006). Walt Disney's Railroad Story. Marceline, Missouri, Virginia Beach, Virginia: The Donning Company Publishers, Walsworth Publishing Company. 
 The Carolwood Society Website
Famous People of Prescott, Arizona (Website of the City of Prescott, AZ)

21st-century American historians
21st-century American male writers
Living people
1942 births
North Hollywood High School alumni
Historians from California
American male non-fiction writers